Walnut trees are any species of tree in the plant genus Juglans, the type genus of the family Juglandaceae, the seeds of which are referred to as walnuts.

The 21 species in the genus range across the north temperate Old World from southeast Europe east to Japan, and more widely in the New World from southeast Canada west to California and south to Argentina.

Edible walnuts, which are consumed worldwide, are usually harvested from cultivated varieties of the species Juglans regia. China produces half of the world total of walnuts.

Etymology
The common name walnut derives from Old English wealhhnutu, literally 'foreign nut' (from wealh 'foreign' + hnutu 'nut'), because it was introduced from Gaul and Italy. The Latin name for the walnut was nux Gallica, "Gallic nut".

Folklore
Tradition has it that a walnut tree should be beaten. This would have the benefit of removing dead wood and stimulating shoot formation.

Production

In 2017, world production of walnuts (in shell) was 3.8 million tonnes, led by China with producing half of the world total (table). Other major producers were the United States (15%) and Iran (9%).

Cultivation and uses

The two most commercially important species are J. regia for timber and nuts, and J. nigra for timber. Both species have similar cultivation requirements and are widely grown in temperate zones.

Walnuts are light-demanding species that benefit from protection from wind. Walnuts are also very hardy against drought.

Interplanting walnut plantations with a nitrogen fixing plant, such as Elaeagnus × ebbingei or Elaeagnus umbellata, and various Alnus species, results in a 30% increase in tree height and girth (Hemery 2001).

When grown for nuts, care must be taken to select cultivars that are compatible for pollination purposes; although some cultivars are marketed as "self fertile", they will generally fruit better with a different pollination partner. Many different cultivars are available for growers, and offer different growth habits, flowering and leafing, kernel flavours and shell thicknesses.  A key trait for more northerly latitudes of North America and Europe is phenology, with ‘late flushing’ being particularly important to avoid frost damage in spring.  Some cultivars have been developed for novel ‘hedge’ production systems developed in Europe and would not suit more traditional orchard systems.

Flowers
The leaves and blossoms of the walnut tree normally appear in spring. Female flowers appear in a cluster at the peak of the current year’s leafy shoots.

Fruit
The fruits of the walnut are a type of accessory fruit known as a pseudodrupe (or drupe-like nut), the outer covering of the fruit is an involucre - in a drupe the covering would be derived from the carpel.

Nuts and kernels

The nut kernels of all the species are edible, but the walnuts most commonly traded are from the J. regia, the only species which has a large nut and thin shell. J. nigra kernels are also produced commercially in the US.

Two-thirds of the world export market and 99% of US walnuts are grown in California's Central Valley and in Coastal Valleys, from Redding in the north to Bakersfield in the south.  Of the more than 30 varieties of J. regia grown there, Chandler and Hartley account for over half of total production. In California commercial production, the Hinds' black walnut (J. hindsii) and the hybrid between J. hindsii and J. regia, Juglans x paradox, are widely used as rootstocks for J. regia cultivars because of their resistance to Phytophthora and to a very limited degree, the oak root fungus.  However, trees grafted on these rootstocks often succumb to black line.

In some countries, immature nuts in their husks are preserved in vinegar. In the UK, these are called pickled walnuts and this is one of the major uses for fresh nuts from the small scale plantings. In Armenian cuisine, unripe walnuts, including husks, are preserved in sugar syrup and eaten whole. In Italy, liqueurs called Nocino and Nocello are flavoured with walnuts, while Salsa di Noci (walnut sauce) is a pasta sauce originating from Liguria. In Georgia, walnuts are ground with other ingredients to make walnut sauce.

Walnuts are heavily used in India. In Jammu, it is used widely as a prasad (offering) to Mother Goddess Vaisnav Devi and, generally, as a dry food in the season of festivals such as Diwali.

The nuts are rich in oil, and are widely eaten both fresh and in cookery. Walnut oil is expensive and consequently is used sparingly; most often in salad dressings.  Walnut oil has been used in oil paint, as an effective binding medium, known for its clear, glossy consistency and nontoxicity.

Manos and Stone studied the composition of seed oils from several species of the Rhoipteleaceae and Juglandaceae and found the nut oils were generally more unsaturated from species which grow in the temperate zones and more saturated for species which grow in the tropical zones.  In the northerly-growing section Trachycaryon, J. cinerea oil was reported to contain 15% linolenate (the report did not specify whether the linolenate was the alpha (n-3) or gamma (n-6) isomer, or perhaps a mixture), 2% of saturated palmitate, and a maximum concentration of 71% linoleate.  In the section Juglans, J. regia nut oil was found to contain from 10% to 11% linolenate, 6% to 7% palmitate, and a maximum concentration of  linoleate (62% to 68%).  In the section Cardiocaryon, the nut oils of J. ailantifolia and J. mandshurica were reported to contain (respectively) 7% and 5% of linolenate, 2% of palmitate, and maximum concentrations of 74% and 79% linoleate.  Within the section Rhysocaryon, the nut oils of the  U.S. native black walnuts J. microcarpa and J. nigra were reported to contain (respectively) 7% and 3% linolenate, 4% and 3% palmitate, and 70% and 69% linoleate.  The remaining results for black walnuts were: J. australis contained 2% linolenate, 7% palmitate, and 61% linoleate; J. boliviana contained 4% linolenate, 4% palmitate, and 70% linoleate; J. hirsuta contained 2% linolenate, 5% palmitate, and 75% linoleate; J. mollis contained 0% linolenate, 5% palmitate, 46% linoleate, and 49% oleate; J. neotropica contained 3% linolenate, 5% palmitate, and 50% linoleate; and  J. olanchana contained only a trace of linolenate, 9% palmitate, and 73% linoleate;

Shells

The walnut shell has a wide variety of uses. Eastern black walnut (J. nigra) shell is the hardest of the walnut shells, and therefore has the highest resistance to breakdown. 
Cleansing and polishing
Walnut shells are mostly used to clean soft metals, fiberglass, plastics, wood and stone. This environmentally friendly and recyclable soft grit abrasive is well suited for air blasting, deburring, descaling, and polishing operations because of its elasticity and resilience. Uses include cleaning automobile and jet engines, electronic circuit boards, and paint and graffiti removal. For example: In the early days of jet transportation, crushed walnut shells were used to scour the compressor airfoils clean, but when engines with air cooled vanes and blades in the turbine started being manufactured, this practice was stopped because the crushed shells tended to plug up the cooling passages to the turbine, resulting in turbine failures due to overheating.
Oil well drilling
 The shell is used widely in oil well drilling for lost circulation material in making and maintaining seals in fracture zones and unconsolidated formations.
Flour
 Flour from walnut shells can be used in thermoplastic starch composites to substitute oil derivatives.
Paint thickener
 Walnut shells are added to paint to give it a thicker consistency for "plaster effect" ranges.
Explosives
 Used as a filler in dynamite
Cosmetic cleaner
 Occasionally used in soap and exfoliating cleansers

Husks

Walnut husks are often used to create a rich yellow-brown to dark brown dye used for dyeing fabric, yarn or wood and for other purposes.  The dye does not require a mordant and will readily stain the hand if picked without gloves.

Wood

The common walnut, and the black walnut and its allies, are important for their attractive timber, which is hard, dense, tight-grained and polishes to a very smooth finish. The color is dark chocolate or similar in the heartwood changing by a sharp boundary to creamy white in the sapwood. When kiln-dried, walnut wood tends toward a dull brown color, but when air-dried can become a rich purplish-brown. Because of its color, hardness and grain, it is a prized furniture and carving wood.

When walnut vascular cambium is involved in a crotch (a branch fork), it behaves unusually, producing characteristic "crotch figure" in the wood which it makes. The grain figure exposed when a crotch in a walnut log is cut in the plane of its one entering branch and two exiting branches is attractive and sought after.

There are some differences between the wood of the European walnut (Juglans regia) and the wood of the black walnut (Juglans nigra). For example, Juglans regia wood sometimes has patches with a wavy texture. Black walnut wood tends to be darker than European walnut wood, and can suffer from paler sapwood that only really comes to light when the wood has been planed.

Walnut wood has been the timber of choice for gun makers for centuries, including the Gewehr 98 and Lee–Enfield rifles of the First World War. It remains one of the most popular choices for rifle and shotgun stocks, and is generally considered to be the premium – as well as the most traditional – wood for gun stocks, due to its resilience to compression along the grain. Walnut is also used in lutherie and for the body of pipe organs.

Walnut burls (or "burrs" in Europe) are commonly used to create bowls and other turned pieces. Veneer sliced from walnut burl is one of the most valuable and highly prized by cabinet makers and prestige car manufacturers.

The wood of the butternut and related Asian species is of much lower value, softer, coarser, less strong and heavy, and paler in colour.

Freshly sawed walnut heartwood may be greenish in color, but with exposure to air this color quickly changes to brown due to oxidation of the pigment.

In North America, forestry research has been undertaken mostly on J. nigra, aiming to improve the quality of planting stock and markets. In some areas of the US, black walnut is the most valuable commercial timber species. The Walnut Council is the key body linking growers with scientists. In Europe, various EU-led scientific programmes have studied walnut growing for timber.

The Cherokee Indians would produce a black dye from walnut bark, which they used to dye cloth. As early as the 2nd century CE, shells and kernels of the edible walnut were used to make a dye solution in the Levant.

Parkland and garden trees
Walnuts are very attractive trees in parks and large gardens. Walnut trees are easily propagated from the nuts. Seedlings grow rapidly on good soils.
The Japanese walnut in particular is known for its huge leaves, which have a tropical appearance.

As garden trees, they have some drawbacks, in particular the falling nuts, and the releasing of the allelopathic compound juglone, though a number of gardeners do grow them. However, different walnut species vary in the amount of juglone they release from the roots and fallen leaves - J. nigra, in particular, is known for its toxicity, both to plants and horses. Juglone is toxic to plants such as tomato, apple, and birch, and may cause stunting and death of nearby vegetation.  Juglone appears to be one of the walnut's primary defence mechanisms against potential competitors for resources (water, nutrients and sunlight), and its effects are felt most strongly inside the tree's "drip line" (the circle around the tree marked by the horizontal distance of its outermost branches). However, even plants at a seemingly great distance outside the drip line can be affected, and juglone can linger in the soil for several years even after a walnut is removed as its roots slowly decompose and release juglone into the soil.

Walnut as wildlife food plants
Walnut species are used as food plants by the larvae of some Lepidoptera species. These include:
 Brown-tail moth (Euproctis chrysorrhoea)
 Coleophora case-bearers (moths) C. laticornella (recorded on J. nigra) and C. pruniella.
 Common emerald (a geometer moth) (Hemithea aestivaria)
 Small emperor moth (Pavonia pavonia)
 The engrailed (a geometer moth) (Ectropis crepuscularia)
 Walnut sphinx moth (Amorpha juglandis)
 The bride (a moth) (Catocala neogama) – nominate subspecies on butternut and others, C. n. euphemia on Arizona black walnut, perhaps Texas black walnut and others.

The nuts are consumed by other animals, such as mice and squirrels.

In California (US) and Switzerland, crows have been witnessed taking walnuts into their beaks, flying up to 60 feet or so in the air, and dropping them to the ground to crack the shells and eat the nut inside.

Nutritional information
The raw edible seed of walnut is composed of 4% water, 14% carbohydrates, 15% protein, and 65% fat. In a 100 gram amount, walnuts provide 654 calories and are a rich source (≥20% of Daily Value) of protein, dietary fiber, the B vitamins, niacin, vitamin B6, and folate, and several dietary minerals, particularly manganese.

Walnut oil is composed mostly of polyunsaturated fatty acids, particularly alpha-linolenic acid and linoleic acid, although it also contains oleic acid, a monounsaturated fat and 31% of total fat is saturated fat.

Systematics

Taxonomy
The genus Juglans is divided into four sections.

Sections and species

The best-known member of the genus is the Persian walnut (J. regia, literally "royal walnut"), native from the Balkans in southeast Europe, southwest and central Asia to the Himalaya and southwest China. Walnuts are a traditional feature of Iranian cuisine; the nation has extensive orchards which are an important feature of regional economies. In Kyrgyzstan alone, there are 230,700 ha of walnut-fruit forest, where J. regia is the dominant overstory tree (Hemery and Popov 1998).  In non-European English-speaking nations, the nut of the J. regia is often called the "English walnut";  in Great Britain, the "common walnut."

The eastern black walnut (J. nigra) is a common species in its native eastern North America, and is also widely cultivated elsewhere. The nuts are edible, and though they are often used in expensive baked goods, the Persian walnut is preferred for everyday use because it is easier to extract the nutmeat. The wood is particularly valuable.

The Hinds' black walnut (J. hindsii) is native to northern California, where it has been widely used commercially as a rootstock for J. regia trees.  Hinds' black walnut shells do not have the deep grooves characteristic of the eastern black walnut.

The Japanese walnut (J. ailantifolia) is similar to butternut, distinguished by the larger leaves up to 90 cm long, and round (not oval) nuts. The variety cordiformis, often called the heartnut has heart-shaped nuts; the common name of this variety is the source of the sectional name Cardiocaryon.

The butternut (J. cinerea) is also native to eastern North America, where it is currently endangered by an introduced disease, butternut canker, caused by the fungus Sirococcus clavigignenti-juglandacearum. Its leaves are 40–60 cm long, the fruits are oval, the shell has very tall, very slender ridges, and the kernel is especially high in fat.

Hybrids
J. × bixbyi Rehd.—J. ailantifolia x J. cinerea
J. × intermedia Carr.—J. nigra x J. regia
J. × notha Rehd.—J. ailantifolia x J. regia
J. × quadrangulata (Carr.) Rehd.—J. cinerea x J. regia
J. × sinensis (D. C.) Rehd.—J. mandschurica x J. regia
J. × paradox Burbank—J. hindsii x J. regia
J. × royal Burbank—J. hindsii x J. nigra

Phylogeny
A study of sequenced nuclear DNA from the external transcribed spacer (ETS) of ribosomal DNA (rDNA), the internal transcribed spacer (ITS) of rDNA, and the second intron of the LEAFY gene taken from at least one individual of most of the species of Juglans has supported several conclusions:

 The genus Juglans is monophyletic;
 Sect. Cardiocaryon is sister to Sect. Trachycaryon;
 Sect. Juglans is sister to Sect. Cardiocaryon and Sect. Trachycaryon together;
 Sect. Rhysocaryon is monophyletic and sister to Sect. Juglans, Sect. Cardiocaryon, and Sect. Trachycaryon together;
 Sect. Rhysocaryon, the black walnuts, contains two clades:
 one comprises the more northerly species J. californica, J. hindsii, J. hirsuta, J. major, J. microcarpa, and J. nigra;
 the other comprises the more southerly species J. australis, J. boliviana, J. jamaicensis, J. molis, J. neotropica, J. olanchana, J. steyermarkii, and J. venezuelensis
 J. olanchana var. standleyi seems to be more closely related to J. steyermarkii than to J. olanchana var. olanchana, suggesting J. olanchana var. standleyi might be better understood as either a separate species or a variety of J. steyermarkii.

The paper presenting these results did not publish any new names for the subdivisions of sect. Rhysocaryon, for any combinations of the other sections, or for J. olanchana var. standleyi.

Paleontological history
Fossils of Juglans nuts have been described from the Tertiary period of North America. The paleontological history of Juglans regia in Europe shows signs of a post-Ice-Age re-expansíon from refugia in the southeast, much influenced by people carrying walnut nuts about after the numbers of humans had been much increased by the start of agriculture.

See also
 Hickory
 Pecan

References

External links

Juglans species throughout the world
Rethinking the history of common walnut (Juglans regia L.) in Europe: Its origins and human interactions by Paola Pollegioni et al
Fossil History of the Juglandaceae
https://www.ars.usda.gov/ARSUserFiles/31120/walnutsymposium.pdf
Scientists crack origin of the Persian walnut 4 June 2019
Notes on the Geological History of the Walnuts and Hickories by Edward W. Berry, The Plant World, Vol. 15, No. 10 (October, 1912), pp. 225–240 (16 pages)
16.58-minute Youtube video about making a sideboard out of black walnut wood.

 
Juglandinae
Fagales genera
Edible nuts and seeds
Plants used in traditional Chinese medicine
Plant dyes